The Iron Man: A Children's Story in Five Nights is a 1968 science fiction novel by British Poet Laureate Ted Hughes, first published by Faber and Faber in the UK with illustrations by George Adamson. Described by some as a modern fairy tale, it narrates the unexpected arrival in England of a giant "metal man" of unknown origin who rains destruction on the countryside by eating industrial farm equipment, before befriending a small boy and defending the world from a dragon from outer space. Expanding the narrative beyond a criticism of warfare and inter-human conflict, Hughes later wrote a sequel, The Iron Woman (1993), describing retribution based on environmental themes related to pollution.

Story 
The Iron Man arrives seemingly                                                                              from nowhere, and his appearance is described in detail. To survive, he feeds on local farm equipment. When the farm hands discover their destroyed tractors and diggers, a trap is set consisting of a covered pit on which a red lorry is set as bait. Hogarth, a local boy, lures the Iron Man to the trap. The plan succeeds, and the Iron Man is buried alive. The next spring, the Iron Man digs himself free of the pit. To keep him out of the way, Hogarth brings the Iron Man to a scrap-heap to feast. The Iron Man promises not to cause further trouble for the locals, as long as no one troubles him.

Time passes, and the Iron Man is treated as merely another member of the community. However, astronomers monitoring the sky make a frightening new discovery: an enormous space-being, resembling a dragon, moving from orbit to land on Earth. The creature (soon dubbed the "Space-Bat-Angel-Dragon") crashes heavily on Australia (which it is large enough to cover the whole of) and demands that humanity provide him with food.

Terrified, humans send their armies to destroy the dragon, but it remains unharmed. When the Iron Man hears of this global threat, he allows himself to be disassembled and transported to Australia where he challenges the creature to a contest of strength.  If the Iron Man can withstand the heat of burning petroleum for longer than the creature can withstand the heat of the Sun, the creature must obey the Iron Man's commands forevermore: if the Iron Man melts or is afraid of melting before the space being undergoes or fears pain in the Sun, the creature has permission to devour the whole Earth.

After playing this game for two rounds, the dragon is so badly burned that he no longer appears physically frightening.  The Iron Man by contrast has only a deformed ear-lobe to show for his pains. The alien creature admits defeat. When asked why he came to Earth, the dragon reveals that he is a peaceful "star spirit" who experienced excitement about the ongoing sights and sounds produced by the violent warfare of humanity. In his own life, he was a singer of the "music of the spheres"; the harmony of his kind that keeps the cosmos in balance in stable equilibrium.

The Iron Man orders the dragon to sing to the inhabitants of Earth, flying just behind the sunset, to help soothe humanity toward a sense of peace. The beauty of his music distracts the population from its egocentrism and tendency to fight, causing the first worldwide lasting peace.

Publishing 
The first North American edition was also published in 1968, by Harper & Row with illustrations by Robert Nadler. Its main title was changed to The Iron Giant, and internal mentions of the metal man changed to iron giant, to avoid confusion with the Marvel Comics character Iron Man. American editions have continued the practice, as Iron Man has become a multimedia franchise.

Faber and Faber published a new edition in 1985 with illustrations by Andrew Davidson, for which Hughes and Davidson won the Kurt Maschler Award, or the Emils. From 1982 to 1999 that award recognised one British "work of imagination for children, in which text and illustration are integrated so that each enhances and balances the other." The 1985 Davidson edition was published in Britain and America (retaining 'giant') and there were re-issues with the Davidson illustrations, including some with other cover artists. Yet the novel has been re-illustrated by at least two others, Dirk Zimmer and Laura Carlin (current, Walker Books). 

In August 2019, an updated illustrated version was released in the UK with new illustrations from artist Chris Mould.

Adaptations
Pete Townshend produced a musical concept album based on the novel in 1989.
In 1999, Warner Bros. released an animated film using the novel as a basis, titled The Iron Giant, directed by Brad Bird and co-produced by Pete Townshend.

References

Bibliography
 The Iron Man, illus. by George Adamson. London: Faber and Faber, 26 February 1968 
 The Iron Giant, illus. by Robert Nadler. New York: Harper & Row, 23 October 1968
 The Iron Man, illus. by George Adamson. London: Faber and Faber, 11 October 1971 (paperback edition) 
 L'Uomo di Ferro: Lotta di giganti per la salvezza della terra, transl. into Italian of The Iron Man by Sandra Georgini, illus. by George Adamson. Milan: Biblioteca Universale, Rizzoli, 1977
 The Iron Man, illus. by George Adamson: “English language textbook with Japanese annotations” by Yuuichi Hashimoto. Tokyo: Shinozaki Shorin, 1980
 A Vasember, transl. into Hungarian of The Iron Man by Katalin Damokos, illus. György Korga . Budapest: Móra Könyvkiadó, 1981 
 Le Géant de fer, transl. into French of The Iron Man by Sophie de Vogelas; illus. by Philippe Munch; Folio cadet 52. Éditions Gallimard Jeunesse, 1984 
 The Iron Man, illus. by Andrew Davidson. London: Faber and Faber, 1985  (cased);  (paperback)
 The Iron Giant, illus. by Dirk Zimmer. New York: Harper & Row, 1988 
 The Iron Man, illus. by Andrew Davidson. London: Faber and Faber, 1989  (paperback)
 Le Géant de fer, transl. into French of The Iron Man by Sophie de Vogelas; illus. by Jean Torton; Folio cadet 295. Éditions Gallimard Jeunesse, 1992 
 Rautamies, transl. into Finnish of The Iron Man by Sinikka Sajama; illus. Andrew Davidson. Karkkila: Kustannus-Mäkelä, 1993 
 Der Eisenmann, transl. into German of The Iron Man by U.-M. Gutzschhahn, illus. by Jindra Čapek. Frankfurt-am-Main: S. Fischer (Fischer Taschenbuch) 1997  
 The Iron Giant, illus. by Andrew Davidson. New York: Alfred A. Knopf, 1999 ; (reprinted as a paperback by Yearling Books, an imprint of Random House )
 L'Uomo di ferro, transl. into Italian of The Iron Man by Ilva Tron; illus. by Andrew Davidson; Junior Mondadori series. Milan: Mondadori, 2003 
 Y dyn haearn, transl. into Welsh of The Iron Man by Emily Huws; illus. by Andrew Davidson. Llanrwst: Gwasg Carreg Gwalch, 2004 
 The Iron Man, illus. by Tom Gauld. London: Faber and Faber, 2005 
 The Iron Man, illus. by Laura Carlin. London: Walker Books in collaboration with Faber and Faber, 2010 
 El hombre de hierro, illus. by Laura Carlin. Barcelona: Vicens Vives, 2011   
 The Iron Man, illus. by Andrew Davidson. London: Faber and Faber, 2013  (paperback)
 L'Uomo di ferro, transl. into Italian of The Iron Man by Ilva Tron, illus. by I. Bruno. Milan: Oscar junior, Mondadori, 2013

External links
 The Iron Man by Ted Hughes at Primary Resources

1968 British novels
1968 science fiction novels
British children's novels
Children's science fiction novels
Novels by Ted Hughes
Faber and Faber books
British novels adapted into plays
British novels adapted into films
1968 children's books
Fiction about giants
Fictional humanoid robots
Science fiction novels adapted into films